Jaruwat Saensuk (born 21 May 1996) is a Thai competitive rower.

He competed at the 2016 Summer Olympics in Rio de Janeiro, in the men's single sculls.

References

External links

1996 births
Living people
Jaruwat Saensuk
Jaruwat Saensuk
Rowers at the 2016 Summer Olympics
Rowers at the 2014 Asian Games
Jaruwat Saensuk
Jaruwat Saensuk
Southeast Asian Games medalists in rowing
Rowers at the 2018 Asian Games
Medalists at the 2018 Asian Games
Asian Games medalists in rowing
Jaruwat Saensuk
Competitors at the 2013 Southeast Asian Games
Jaruwat Saensuk
Jaruwat Saensuk